Jang Do-yeon (born March 10, 1985), is a South Korean comedian, signed with KOEN Group. She was a cast member in MBC's variety show, We Got Married, paired with actor Choi Min-yong.

Education
Jang was a student at Kyung Hee University's College of Art and Design, although, due to commitments in television broadcasts, she has yet to graduate from her course.

Career
In 2007, Jang made her debut in the South Korean entertainment industry when she appeared on Mnet's talk show, Shin Dong-yeop's Talk King 18. In the following year, she became a cast member of Gag Concert, after joining the 22nd class of KBS comedians.

Filmography

Television series

Television shows

Hosting

Web shows

Awards and nominations

State honors

Listicles

Notes

References

External links
 
|thumb

1985 births
Living people
People from South Jeolla Province
South Korean women comedians
Kyung Hee University alumni
Best Variety Performer Female Paeksang Arts Award (television) winners